The Animals (also billed as Eric Burdon and the Animals) are an English rock band, formed in Newcastle upon Tyne in the early 1960s. The band moved to London upon finding fame in 1964. The Animals were known for their gritty, bluesy sound and deep-voiced frontman Eric Burdon, as exemplified by their signature song and transatlantic number-one hit single "The House of the Rising Sun" as well as by hits such as  "We Gotta Get Out of This Place", "It's My Life", "Don't Bring Me Down", "I'm Crying", "See See Rider" and "Don't Let Me Be Misunderstood." The band balanced tough, rock-edged pop singles against rhythm-and-blues-oriented album material and were part of the British Invasion of the US.

The Animals underwent numerous personnel changes in the mid-1960s, and suffered from poor business management, leading the original incarnation to split up in 1966. Burdon assembled a mostly new lineup of musicians under the name Eric Burdon and the Animals; the much-changed act moved to California and achieved commercial success as a psychedelic and hard rock band with hits such as "San Franciscan Nights", "When I Was Young" and "Sky Pilot" before disbanding at the end of the decade. Altogether, the group had 10 top-20 hits in both the UK Singles Chart and the US Billboard Hot 100.

The original lineup of Burdon, Alan Price, Chas Chandler, Hilton Valentine and John Steel reunited for a one-off benefit concert in Newcastle in 1968. They later launched brief comebacks in 1975 and 1983. Several partial regroupings of the original-era members have occurred since then under various names. The Animals were inducted into the Rock and Roll Hall of Fame in 1994.

History

The Animals (1962–1966)
Formed in Newcastle upon Tyne during 1962 and 1963 when Burdon joined the Alan Price Rhythm and Blues Combo, the original lineup was Burdon (vocals), Price (organ and keyboards), Hilton Valentine (guitar), John Steel (drums) and Bryan "Chas" Chandler (bass).

Originally formed as the Alan Price Combo, they changed their name to the Animals. Allegedly, they were dubbed "animals" because of their wild stage act, and the name stuck. In a 2013 interview, Burdon denied this, stating that the name was a tribute to a friend known as "Animal" Hogg. In a 2021 interview, Steel affirmed that the name was given them by Graham Bond. The Animals' success in their hometown and a connection with Yardbirds manager Giorgio Gomelsky motivated them to move to London in 1964 in the immediate wake of Beatlemania and the beat boom takeover of the popular music scene, just in time to play an important role in the British Invasion of the American music charts.

The Animals performed fiery versions of the staple rhythm-and-blues repertoire, covering songs by artists such as Jimmy Reed, John Lee Hooker, Nina Simone. Signed to EMI's Columbia label, their first single was a rocking version of the standard "Baby Let Me Follow You Down" (retitled "Baby Let Me Take You Home").

In June 1964, the transatlantic number-one hit "The House of the Rising Sun" was released. Burdon's vocals and the particular arrangement, featuring Price's haunting organ riffs, created perhaps the first folk-rock hit. Debate continues regarding the Animals' inspiration for the arrangement, which has been variously ascribed to prior versions by Bob Dylan, folk singer Dave Van Ronk, blues singer Josh White (who recorded it twice in 1944 and 1949) and singer/pianist Nina Simone (who recorded it in 1962 for Nina at the Village Gate). The arrangement is said to owe much to the band's desire to become the most memorable of the many acts on tour in the UK. 

The Animals' two-year chart career, with their songs produced by Mickie Most, featured intense, gritty pop-music covers such as Sam Cooke's "Bring It On Home to Me" and the Simone-popularised number "Don't Let Me Be Misunderstood." In contrast, their album tracks stayed with rhythm and blues, with John Lee Hooker's "Boom Boom" and Ray Charles' "I Believe to My Soul" as notable examples.

In October 1964, the Animals visited New York for concert dates and an appearance on The Ed Sullivan Show. They were transported from the airport into Manhattan in a motorcade, chased by shrieking young female fans, consisting of Sunbeam Alpine Series IV top-down convertibles with fashion models riding along. The Animals sang "I'm Crying" and "The House of the Rising Sun" to a packed audience of hysterical girls screaming throughout both performances on Sullivan's show. In December, the MGM film Get Yourself a College Girl was released, featuring the Animals and the Dave Clark Five. The Animals sang the Chuck Berry song "Around and Around" in the film.

By May 1965, the group was starting to feel internal pressures. Price left because of personal and musical differences, as well as his fear of flying while on tour. He went on to a successful career as a solo artist and with the Alan Price Set. Mick Gallagher filled in for Price on keyboards for a short time until Dave Rowberry replaced Gallagher. Rowberry was on hand for the hit songs "We Gotta Get Out of This Place" and "It's My Life."

The Animals assembled a big band to play at the fifth annual British Jazz and Blues Festival in Richmond. The Animals Big Band made their one public appearance on 5 August 1965. In addition to Burdon, Rowberry, Valentine, Chandler and Steel, the band featured a brass/horn section of Ian Carr, Kenny Wheeler and Greg Brown on trumpet and Stan Robinson, Al Gay, Dick Morrissey and Paul Carroll on saxophone.

Many of the Animals' hits originated from Brill Building songwriters recruited by Mickie Most, but the group, and Burdon in particular, felt this to be too creatively restrictive. As 1965 ended, the group signed a new deal with their American label MGM Records for the US and Canada and switched to Decca Records for the rest of the world. They also ended their association with Most and began to work with MGM Records producer Tom Wilson, who allowed them more artistic freedom. In early 1966, MGM collected the band's hits on The Best of The Animals, and it became their best-selling album in the US. In February 1966, Steel left and was replaced by Barry Jenkins. A leftover rendition of Goffin–King's "Don't Bring Me Down" was the group's last hit as the Animals. The next single, "See See Rider," was credited to Eric Burdon and the Animals. By September 1966, the original incarnation of the group had split up. Their last batch of recordings was released on the album Animalism in November 1966.

Burdon began work on a solo album called Eric Is Here, which also featured his UK number-14 solo hit single "Help Me, Girl," which he heavily promoted on TV shows such as Ready Steady Go! and Top of the Pops in late 1966. Eric Is Here was Burdon's final release for Decca Records.

By this time, the Animals' business affairs "were in a total shambles" according to Chandler (who went on to manage Jimi Hendrix and produce Slade) and the group disbanded. Even by the standards of the day, when artists tended to be financially naïve, the Animals made very little money, eventually claiming mismanagement and theft on the part of their manager Michael Jeffery.

Eric Burdon and the Animals (1966–1968) 

A group with Burdon, Jenkins and new sidemen John Weider (guitar/violin/bass), Vic Briggs (guitar/piano) and Danny McCulloch (bass) was formed under the name Eric Burdon and Animals (or sometimes Eric Burdon and the New Animals) in December 1966, and changed direction. The hard-driving blues sound was transformed into Burdon's version of psychedelia as the former heavy-drinking Geordie (who later said he could never get used to Newcastle "where the rain comes at you sideways") relocated to California and became a spokesman for the Love Generation.

Early performances by this group did not include any of the hits for which the original group had become known. Some of the new Animals' hits included "San Franciscan Nights," "Monterey" (a tribute to the 1967 Monterey Pop Festival) and "Sky Pilot." Their sound was much heavier than that of the original group, with Burdon screaming more and louder on live versions of "Paint It Black" and "Hey Gyp." By 1968, they had developed a more experimental sound on songs such as "We Love You Lil" and the 19-minute "New York 1963–America 1968" from the album Every One of Us.

Zoot Money was added to the lineup in April 1968, initially as organist/pianist only, but upon McCulloch's departure, he also took on bass and occasional lead vocals.

In July 1968, Andy Summers (later the guitarist for the Police) replaced Briggs. Both Money and Summers were formerly of British psychedelic outfit Dantalian's Chariot, and much of this new lineup's set was composed of Dantalian's Chariot songs, which caught Burdon's interest. Because of Money's multi-instrumental load, in live settings, bass was played alternately by Weider and Summers.

By December 1968, this incarnation of the Animals had dissolved, but their double album Love Is was released internationally, featuring the singles "Ring of Fire" and "River Deep – Mountain High".

Numerous reasons have been cited for the breakup, the most famous of which involved an aborted Japanese tour. The tour had been scheduled for September 1968 but was delayed until November after difficulty obtaining visas. Only a few dates into the tour, the promoters (whom the band did not know were yakuza) kidnapped the band's manager and threatened him at gunpoint to write an IOU for $25,000 to cover losses incurred by the tour's delay. Correctly surmising that his captors could not read English, he added a note to the IOU that it was written under duress. The yakuza released him, but warned that he and the band would have to leave Japan the next day or be killed. The Animals promptly fled the country, leaving all of their tour equipment behind. Money and Summers each pursued solo careers, Weider signed up with Family and Burdon joined forces with a funk/r&b/rock group from Long Beach, California called War.

Reunions of the Animals
The original Animals lineup of Burdon, Price, Valentine, Chandler and Steel reunited for a benefit concert in Newcastle in December 1968 and reformed in late 1975 to record again. Burdon later said that nobody understood why they had agreed to this short reunion. They embarked on a brief tour in 1976 and shot videos for their new songs such as "Lonely Avenue" and "Please Send Me Someone to Love." They released an album in 1977 that was aptly titled Before We Were So Rudely Interrupted. The album received critical praise. Burdon and Valentine also recorded some demos at that time that were never released. On 12 December 1982, Burdon performed with Price and a complete lineup, foreshadowing future events.

All five original band members reunited in 1983 for the album Ark and a world concert tour, supplemented by Zoot Money on keyboards, Nippy Noya on percussion, Steve Gregory on saxophone and Steve Grant on guitar. The first single, "The Night," reached number 48 on the Billboard Hot 100 chart. The band released a second single called "Love Is for All Time," which did not chart.

Songs performed on the Ark tour included some from the 1960s, but most were from the band's contemporary repertoire, such as "Heart Attack", "No More Elmore" (both released a year earlier by Burdon), "Oh Lucky Man" (from the 1973 soundtrack album to O Lucky Man! by Price), "It's Too Late", "Tango" and "Young Girls" (later released on Burdon's compilation album The Night). Their Wembley Arena concert on 31 December 1983 (supporting the Police) was released on the Rip it To Shreds live album in 1984 after the Animals had disbanded again. Their 29 November 1983 concert at the Royal Oak Theatre in Royal Oak, Michigan was released on 27 February 2008 as Last Live Show. A film about the reunion tour was shot but never released.

Chandler died from an aneurysm in 1996, putting an end to any possibility of another reunion of the full original lineup.

Later incarnations 

During the 1990s and 2000s, several groups have called themselves the Animals in part:
In the 1990s, Danny McCulloch, from the later-1960s Animals, released several albums as the Animals. The albums contained covers of some original Animals songs, as well as new ones written by McCulloch.
In 1992, Barry Jenkins joined a reconstituted version of the Animals, including "New Animals" members Vic Briggs and Danny McCulloch along with new percussionist Jack McCulloch and Phil Ryan instead of Eric Burdon on lead vocals. The band played the first rock concert held in Red Square, Moscow, as part of a benefit concert for the victims of the Chernobyl nuclear disaster.
In 1993, Valentine formed the Animals II and was joined by Steel in 1994 and Rowberry in 1999. Other members of this version of the band include Steve Hutchinson, Steve Dawson and Martin Bland. From 1999 until Valentine's departure in 2001, the band toured as the Animals. This version featured Tony Liddle on lead vocals backed by Valentine, Steel, Rowberry and Jim Rodford. Chris Allen substituted for Rodford, who was busy with Argent, on bass and backing vocals. Steve Farrell contributed backing vocals and hand percussion.
After Valentine left these Animals in 2001, Steel and Rowberry continued as Animals and Friends with Peter Barton, Rodford, and John E. Williamson. When Rowberry died in 2003, he was replaced by Mick Gallagher (who had briefly replaced Price in 1965). Danny Handley joined the band in 2009, initially as lead guitarist, but replaced Barton on lead vocals when Barton retired in 2012. Scott Whitley had a brief tenure in the band before Roberto "Bobby" Ruiz took over on bass. This successful lineup continues to tour the world with guests such as Steve Cropper and Spencer Davis.
Burdon formed a new backing band in 1998 that was billed as Eric Burdon and the New Animals. This was actually just a renaming of an existing band with whom he had been touring in various forms since 1990. Members of this new group included Dean Restum, Dave Meros, Neal Morse and Aynsley Dunbar. Martin Gerschwitz replaced Morse in 1999 after Ryo Okumoto's brief three-week stint, and Dunbar was replaced by Bernie Pershey in 2001. In 2003, the band started touring as Eric Burdon and the Animals. After the lineup changed in 2006, original guitarist Valentine joined the group for its 2007 and 2008 tours. The group also included Red Young, Paula O'Rourke and Tony Braunagle. After Burdon lost the rights to the name, he formed a new band with different musicians.
In 2016, Burdon formed the current lineup of the Animals, including Johnzo West (guitar/vocals), Davey Allen (keys/vocals), Dustin Koester (drums/vocals), Justin Andres (bass guitar/vocals), Ruben Salinas (sax/flute) and Evan Mackey (trombone).

Dispute over ownership of band name
In 2008, an adjudicator determined that original Animals drummer John Steel owned "the Animals" name in the UK because of a trademark registration that Steel had filed. Eric Burdon had objected to the trademark registration, arguing that he personally embodied any goodwill associated with "the Animals" name. Burdon's argument was rejected, in part because he had billed himself as "Eric Burdon and the Animals" as early as 1967, thus separating the goodwill associated with his own name from that of the band. On 9 September 2013, Burdon's appeal was allowed, and he is now permitted to use the name "the Animals."

Legacy
The original Animals were inducted into the Rock and Roll Hall of Fame in 1994, although Burdon did not attend and the band did not perform. In 2003, the band's version of "The House of the Rising Sun" ranked number 123 on Rolling Stone's 500 Greatest Songs of All Time list. Their 1965 hit single "We Gotta Get Out of This Place" was ranked number 233 on the same list. Both songs are included in the Rock and Roll Hall of Fame's 500 Songs That Shaped Rock and Roll.

On 15 March 2012, in a keynote speech to an audience at the South by Southwest music festival, Bruce Springsteen discussed the Animals' influence on his music at length, stating, "To me, the Animals were a revelation. They were the first records with full-blown class consciousness that I'd ever heard." Of "We Gotta Get Out of This Place" (written by two New York songwriters, Barry Mann and Cynthia Weil), Springsteen said: "That's every song I've ever written ... That's 'Born to Run,' 'Born in the U.S.A.,' everything I've done for the past 40 years including all the new ones. That struck me so deep. It was the first time I felt I heard something come across the radio that mirrored my home life, my childhood." Saying that his album Darkness on the Edge of Town was "filled with Animals," Springsteen played the opening riffs to "Don't Let Me Be Misunderstood" and his own "Badlands" back to back, then said, "Listen up, youngsters!  This is how successful theft is accomplished!"

Tony Banks, keyboardist of British progressive rock band Genesis, drew influence from Alan Price, whom he regarded as "[t]he first person who made me aware of the organ in a rock context."

Awards and nominations
{| class=wikitable
|-
! Year !! Awards !! Work !! Category !! Result
|-
| 1964
| NME Awards
| "The House of the Rising Sun"
| British Disc of the Year 
|

Discography

The Animals (1964; US) / The Animals (1964; UK)
The Animals on Tour (1965; US)
Animal Tracks (1965; UK) / Animal Tracks (1965; US)
Animalisms (1966; UK) / Animalization (1966; US)
Animalism (1966; US)
As Eric Burdon and the Animals
Eric Is Here (1967; US)
Winds of Change (1967)
The Twain Shall Meet (1968)
Every One of Us (1968; US)
Love Is (1968)
As the Animals
Before We Were So Rudely Interrupted (1977)
Ark (1983)

Personnel

Members
Eric Burdon – vocals 
Hilton Valentine – guitar, backing vocals 
Chas Chandler – bass, vocals 
Alan Price – keyboards, backing vocals 
John Steel – drums 
 Mick Gallagher – keyboards 
Dave Rowberry – keyboards, vocals 
Barry Jenkins – drums, backing vocals 
John Weider – guitar, bass, violin, backing vocals 
Vic Briggs – guitar, piano 
Danny McCulloch – bass 
Zoot Money – keyboards, bass, vocals 
Andy Summers – bass, guitar, backing vocals 
Steve Grant – guitar, synthesiser, backing vocals 
Steve Gregory – saxophones 
Nippy Noya – percussion

Spin off band members

Current members 
Animals and Friends/Animals II/Valentine's Animals
 John Steel – drums 
 Danny Handley – guitar, vocals 
 Roberto Ruiz – bass, vocals 
 Barney Williams – keyboards 
Eric Burdon and The Animals

 Eric Burdon – vocals 
 Davey Allen – keyboards, vocals 
 Dustin Koester – drums, vocals 
 Justin Andres – bass, vocals  
 Johnzo West – guitar, vocals 
 Ruben Salinas – saxophone, flute 
 Evan Mackey – trombone

Former members 
Animals and Friends/Animals II/Valentine's Animals

 Hilton Valentine – guitar 
 Joss Elliott – bass 
 George Fearson – guitar 
 Robert Robinson – vocals 
 The Dod – drums 
 Steve Hutchinson – keyboards 
 Martin Bland – bass 
 Steve Dawson – guitar 
 Robert Kane – vocals 
 Steve 'ih' Farrell – live backing vocals 
 Tony Liddle – vocals 
 Jim Rodford – bass 
 Dave Rowberry – keyboards 
 Eamon Cronin – vocals 
 Pete Barton – vocals, bass, guitar 
 John E. Williamson – guitar, vocals 
 Mick Gallagher – keyboards 
 Scott Whitley – bass, vocals

Line-ups

Timeline

See also
Monterey Pop Festival

References

Further reading
 Burdon, Eric. I Used to Be an Animal, but I'm All Right Now. Faber and Faber, 1986. .
 Kent, Jeff. The Last Poet: The Story of Eric Burdon. Witan Books, 1989. .
 Egan, Sean. Animal Tracks: Updated and Expanded: The Story of The Animals, Newcastle's Rising Sons. Askill Publishing, 2012. .
 Burdon, Eric (with J. Marshall Craig). Don't Let Me Be Misunderstood: A Memoir. Thunder's Mouth Press, 2001. .
 Payne, Philip. Eric Burdon:Rebel Without a Pause. Tyne Bridge Publishing, 2015.

External links

 Soul of a Man: The Story of Eric Burdon – January 2009 interview with Eric Burdon
 The Animals in NY by Sally Kempton for the Village Voice 17 September 1964
 
 

 
British Invasion artists
British rhythm and blues musical groups
British rhythm and blues boom musicians
Charly Records artists
Columbia Graphophone Company artists
MGM Records artists
English blues rock musical groups
Musical groups from Newcastle upon Tyne
Musical groups established in 1962
Musical quintets
1962 establishments in England